The Scout and Guide movement in Comoros is served by
 Wezombeli, member of the World Organization of the Scout Movement
 World Federation of Independent Scouts – Comoros, member of the World Federation of Independent Scouts

See also

References